Temple Mills Depot, also known as Temple Mills International (TMI) and the Eurostar Engineering Centre, is a railway depot in Leyton in East London.

History 
Construction of a new depot for Eurostar operations, to replace North Pole Depot, was approved by the UK Government on 15 November 2004. North Pole had served as the maintenance depot for the Eurostar's fleet of Class 373s since opening in 1994, but was inaccessible to the Channel Tunnel Rail Link (High Speed 1), over which all Eurostar services would run from November 2007.

References

External links 

 Temple Mills Depot. Kent Rail

Eurostar
Railway depots in London